Pushpawati River flows through the Valley of Flowers in Chamoli district in Garhwal region of the Indian state  of Uttarakhand.

Course
The Pushpawati rises from the Tipra Glacier, near Rataban, in the  central part of the Garhwal region in the Himalayas. It flows in a southerly direction to join the Bhyundar Ganga near Ghagharia. The combined stream is thereafter known as the Lakshman Ganga. The latter merges with the Alaknanda River at Govindghat.

The Pushpawati drains the Valley of Flowers.

The glaciated upper valley of the Pushpawati is U-shaped. The river flows past thick glacial deposits. A number of glacier-fed streams join it in its upper reaches. It flows through a gorge in its lower reaches. The upper tracts are under permanent cover of snow. Alpine, sub-alpine and temperate vegetation is there in the middle and lower catchments of the river. Human habitation is very sparse.

Mythology
According to legend, the Pandavas, during their years of exile, saw flowers floating down the river. They named it Pushpawati.

Gallery

See also
Valley of Flowers
Gobindghat

References

Rivers of Uttarakhand
Geography of Chamoli district
Rivers of India